Överboda is a locality situated in Umeå Municipality, Västerbotten County, Sweden with 218 inhabitants in 2010.
Big stones with carvings have been found in the area, with pictures and symbols. The individual carvings are 4–7 cm wide and 4 –9 cm high.

References 

Populated places in Umeå Municipality